Sead "Zele" Lipovača (born 31 August 1955) is a Bosnian guitarist, best known as the lead guitarist and founder of the popular former Yugoslav and Bosnian heavy metal band Divlje jagode.

Prior to the forming of Divlje Jagode in 1977 he had been a member of ´Novi Akordi´, "Biseri", "Selekcija" and "Zenit". Lipovača, alongside Marina Tucaković became spiritus movens of the disco band "Mirzino Jato" following the release of their first album in 1978. In 1980 the work of Divlje Jagode continues with a new lineup, one of the new members were bassist Alen Islamović, the new album marked the shift towards heavy metal.

Lipovača lived in Sarajevo until the Bosnian War. He then moved to Zagreb where he lives today. He is married and has a daughter. He is the only Divlje Jagode member to play on every one of their albums.

Equipment
Lipovača claims he has a large collection of guitars. He uses a Gibson Les Paul from 1959, which he says that everything on that guitar is original. He also uses an Ovation 12 string guitar which he bought in America. Apart from these guitars, he has a collection of Fender, Charvel, Jackson and other guitars.

He is most seen with a Fender Stratocaster from 1967 which he modified heavily, he claims that the only original thing on that guitar is the wood. The guitar has Dimarzio Superdistortion bridge pickup and some Fender middle pickup. Lipovača also added a Floyd Rose tremolo on the guitar.

He uses Marshall and Mesa Boogie amplifiers. He uses an Eventide 3000 harmonizer and Whammy effects pedal. He sometimes uses a Dunlop Cry Baby wah-wah pedal.

Discography

With Divlje Jagode

Studio albums
Divlje Jagode (1979)
Stakleni hotel (1981)
Motori (1982)
Čarobnjaci (1984)
Vatra (1985)
Wild Strawberries (1987) - as Wild Strawberries
Konji (1988)
Labude, kad rata ne bude (1994)
Sto vjekova (1997)
Od neba do neba (2003)
Biodinamicka ljubav - (2013)

Compilations
Najbolje (1986)
The Very Best Of (2003)
Najlepse balade: Krivo je more (2004)
Let Na Drugi Svijet 2CD  (2004)

Singles
"Jedina moja" / "Rock 'n' Roll" (1977)
"Moj dilbere" / "Prijatelj" (1978)
"Patkica" / "Kad bi vi, gospođo" (1978)
"Nemam ništa protiv" / "Bit će bolje" (1996)
"Piramida" (2006)

Solo works
Magic Love (1993)
Internal Waves of Love (2016)

External links

Zele Lipovača at Discogs
Zele Lipovača biography

1955 births
Living people
People from Bihać
Bosniaks of Bosnia and Herzegovina
Yugoslav musicians
Bosnia and Herzegovina rock guitarists
20th-century Bosnia and Herzegovina male singers
21st-century Bosnia and Herzegovina male singers